The 2019 Super Taikyu Series is the 28th season of the Super Taikyu Series. The season will start on 23 March at Suzuka Circuit and end on 10 November at Okayama International Circuit.

Regining Champion No.1 GTNET Motorsport Nissan GTR GT3 becomes the 2019 Super Taikyu Series Champion and the 2019 Fuji 24 Hours Winner

Class Champions
Bold drivers indicate a driver that was entered in every race for their respective team. Drivers listed in italics competed in a select number of rounds for their respective team.

Teams and drivers

Calendar and results

Championship standings

Notes:
† – Drivers did not finish the race, but were classified as they completed over 75% of the race distance.

References

External links
 Official website of the Super Taikyu Series

2019 in Japanese motorsport
2019 in TCR Series